Isaac Sotunde (also known as Base One) is a Nigerian rap/hip hop artist, signed to Aquila Records, involved in the Nigerian new school rapper scene.

Early life and Career beginnings 
Isaac Sotunde, "Base One", was born on March 24, 1992. He was raised with his mother, and grew up on the streets of Oshodi in Lagos Nigeria. Base One attended St. Georges Nursery and Primary school in Ipaja, Lagos, moving on to Medal Merit High School in Igando, Lagos, before being admitted into Lagos State University. As an undergraduate at Lagos State University, Base One began actively pursuing a music career, performing across various rap events, comedy events, and competitions. He met producer X Blaze who helped guide him through these endeavours.

By the time he graduated university, Base One had released numerous unofficial tracks and features in local videos. He graduated from the Lagos State University with a degree in Banking & Finance in 2012. After graduating, he decided to pursue a career in music. In 2012, he was featured on the commercially successful YBNL compilation album, executive produced by Olamide. He performed with Olamide in December 2014 at his event “Olamide Live In Concert”, and from this was brought to the attention of Aquila Records' label head, Shina Peller. Following this, Base One was signed to Aquila Records, in 2015.

Music career 
Base One released his first official single "Werey Re O", in April 2015, produced by X Blaze. The single earned him a nomination for Rookie of the Year 2015 at the Nigerian The Headies Awards.

In January 2016, Base One followed his debut single with a double release, "Werey Re O Remix" featuring rappers Olamide and Phyno. His next release "Skon Skon" was a dance song dedicated to the streets where he was raised.

On the 24th March, 2016, he released “At It Again” featuring Kayswitch.
Inspired by the harsh economic situation in Nigeria at the time, he collaborated with Nigerian Fuji musician K1 De Ultimate to release “Better Dey Come” in June 2016.

Musical influences 
Base One credits Notorious BIG, Nas, Jay Z, and Nigerian indigenous rapper Dagrin, as his biggest musical influences.

Singles

Awards and nominations

References 

Nigerian rappers
1992 births
Living people